The goldribbon soapfish (Aulacocephalus temminckii), also known as the goldribbon cod, blue and gold soapfish, gold ribbon grouper or goldstripe groper, is a species of marine ray-finned fish, related to the groupers and included in the subfamily Epinephelinae which is part of the family Serranidae, which also includes the anthias and sea basses. It is found in the Indo-Pacific region.

Description
The goldribbon soapfish is a deep blue coloured grouper which has a bold yellow stripe which runs from the stripe through the eye and along the back to the base of the caudal fin. The dorsal fin contains 9 spines and 12 soft rays while the anal fin has 3 spines and 9 soft rays.

Distribution
The goldribbon soapfish has a wide, disjunct Indo-Pacific distribution. It occurs in the northern Red Sea, off northern South Africa and southern Mozambique, the Comoros, Réunion and Mauritius in the western Indian Ocean. In the Western Pacific Ocean it is found as far north as the Ryukyu Islands of southern Japan, off Korea, Taiwan and southern China. It has been recorded off Thailand and in the Philippines. It also occurs off Australia and New Zealand, Norfolk Island and in French Polynesia.

Habitat and biology
It is a carnivorous species which feeds on fishes and crustaceans. These fish have a toxin, grammistin, which is produced in their skin and which has a bitter taste, the production of the toxin is increased when the fish is threatened.

Taxonomy
The goldribbon soapfish was first formally describedin 1854 by the dutch ichthyologist, herpetologist and physician Pieter Bleeker (1819-1874) with the type locality given as Japan. The genus was created in 1843 by the Dutch zoologist Coenraad Jacob Temminck (1778-1858) and his student, the German ichthyologist Hermann Schlegel (1804-1884) and was originally described without any species until Bleeker added this species. The generic name is a compound of the Greek aulos which means "flute" and kephales which means "head".

Utilisation
The goldribbon soapfish is  rare species in the aquarium trade.

References

Diploprionini
Taxa named by Pieter Bleeker
goldribbon soapfish